Imogen May Pratt Boorman (born 13 May 1971) is an English film and television actress. She is known for portraying Tiffany in the horror film Hellbound: Hellraiser II, Lorina in Dreamchild, Clothhide in May to December and Hannah Preston in Westbeach.

Educated at Benenden School in Kent, Boorman went on to attend the Kent Institute of Art & Design to study for a BTEC Foundation Diploma in General Art and Design.

Filmography

Legal issues
Boorman was arrested in 2006 and appeared in court to admit struggling with ambulance staff at Raigmore Hospital in Inverness. An ambulance had been called to her home at Kindeace by her boyfriend after she accidentally cut herself with a wine glass, however she shouted and swore at police and medical staff who were trying to help her. Following another incident in November 2007, she was given probation and community service for resisting arrest and struggling with police at her home.

In August 2009, Boorman was arrested after she was found drunk in rainy conditions with a three-year-old girl who was dressed as a fairy. She pleaded guilty to "being in charge of a child and wilfully exposing the child in a manner likely to cause unnecessary suffering or injury while she was intoxicated with alcohol or drugs", and was given two years' probation and ordered to complete 120 hours of community service. Boorman's solicitor said that she "had a history of alcohol problems".

In June 2016, Boorman was arrested after pulling into a filling station with two children in the back of her camper van. Staff became aware that she was intoxicated and removed her keys from the van. She later admitted to a drink-driving charge, banned from driving for two years and issued a fine.

References

External links

1971 births
People educated at Benenden School
English film actresses
English television actresses
Living people
People from Pembury
English child actresses
Actresses from Kent